Rozkopaczew  is a village in the administrative district of Gmina Ostrów Lubelski, within Lubartów County, Lublin Voivodeship, in eastern Poland.

The village has a population of 1,100.

References

Rozkopaczew